In the United Kingdom, public holidays are days on which most businesses and non-essential services are closed. Many retail businesses (especially the larger ones) do open on some of the public holidays. There are restrictions on trading on Sundays, Easter Day and Christmas Day in England and Wales and on New Year's Day and Christmas Day in Scotland. Public holidays defined by statute are called bank holidays, but this term can also be used to include common law holidays, which are held by convention. The term "public holidays" can refer exclusively to common law holidays.

There is no automatic right to time off on these days, but banks close and the majority of the working population is granted time off work or extra pay for working on these days, depending on their contracts.

There are eight bank holidays a year in England and Wales, nine in Scotland and ten in Northern Ireland. Additional days have been allocated for special events, such as royal weddings and jubilees. There are seven bank holidays common to all jurisdictions: New Year's Day, Good Friday, the early May bank holiday, the Spring bank holiday, the Summer bank holiday, Christmas Day and Boxing Day. Easter Monday is a bank holiday in England, Wales and Northern Ireland but not in Scotland. In Northern Ireland, St Patrick's Day and Orangemen's Day are also bank holidays. In Scotland, 2 January and St Andrew's Day are bank holidays. The Summer bank holiday varies according to jurisdiction: in Scotland, it is on the first Monday in August, and in the rest of the United Kingdom, it is on the last Monday in August.

History 
In England, Wales and Northern Ireland, Good Friday and Christmas Day are common law holidays, having been customary holidays since time immemorial.

The first official bank holidays were named in the Bank Holidays Act 1871, introduced by Liberal politician and banker Sir John Lubbock. Under the Act, "no person was compelled to make any payment or to do any act upon a bank holiday which he would not be compelled to do or make on Christmas Day or Good Friday, and the making of a payment or the doing of an act on the following day was equivalent to doing it on the holiday". People were so grateful that some called the first bank holidays St Lubbock's Days for a while.

The Act did not include Good Friday and Christmas Day as bank holidays in England, Wales, or Ireland because they were already recognised as common law holidays.

In 1903, the Bank Holiday (Ireland) Act added 17 March, Saint Patrick's Day, as a bank holiday in Ireland only. New Year's Day did not become a bank holiday in England until 1 January 1974. Boxing Day did not become a bank holiday in Scotland until 1974.

Starting in 1965, experimentally, the August bank holiday weekend was observed at the end of August "to give a lead in extending British holidays over a longer summer period". Each year's date was announced in Parliament on an ad hoc basis, to the despair of the calendar and diary publishing trade. The rule seems to have been to select the weekend of the last Saturday in August, so that in 1968 and 1969 Bank Holiday Monday actually fell in September.

A century after the 1871 Act, the Banking and Financial Dealings Act 1971, which currently regulates bank holidays in the UK, was passed. The majority of the current bank holidays were specified in the 1971 Act: however New Year's Day and May Day were not introduced throughout the whole of the UK until 1974 and 1978 respectively. The date of the August bank holiday was changed from the first Monday in August to the last Monday in August in England, Wales and Northern Ireland (but not in Scotland), and the Whitsun bank holiday (Whit Monday) was replaced by the Late Spring Bank Holiday, fixed as the last Monday in May. From 1978, the final Monday of May in Scotland (a statutory holiday in the rest of the UK) and the first Monday in May in the rest of the UK (a statutory holiday in Scotland) have been proclaimed as bank holidays.

In January 2007, the St Andrew's Day Bank Holiday (Scotland) Act 2007 was given royal assent, making 30 November (or the following Monday if 30 November falls on a weekend) a bank holiday in Scotland.

Future 
There are calls for extra public holidays on the patron saints' days in England (for St. George's Day), and Wales (for St. David's Day). For example, in 2018 the Labour Party announced it would make those days bank holidays if elected. The same year, an online petition to the Prime Minister as to Wales received 3,577 signatures.

In 2009, it was reported that St Piran's Day (patron saint of Cornwall) on 5 March is already given as an unofficial day off to many government and other workers in the county. It is suggested that a move from the May bank holiday to a St Piran's Day bank holiday in Cornwall would benefit the Cornish economy by £20–35 million.

The number of holidays in the UK is relatively small compared to many other European countries. However, direct comparison is inaccurate since the 'substitute day' scheme of deferment does not apply in most European countries, where holidays that coincide with a weekend (29% of fixed-date holidays) are "lost". In fact, the average number of non-weekend holidays in such countries is only marginally higher (and in some cases lower) than the UK. Worth mentioning is that public holidays in Europe which fall on Thursday or Tuesday typically become "puente" or "bridge" four-day or even six-day extended holiday weekends as people tend to use one or two days from their holiday entitlement to take off Monday and/or Friday.

After the election of the coalition government in May 2010, the Department of Culture, Media and Sport launched a pre-consultation in 2011 which included the suggestion of moving the May Day Bank Holiday to October, to be a "UK Day" or "Trafalgar Day" (21 October) or to St David's Day and St George's Day.

Legal basis 

Bank holidays are established in several ways:
 by statute (statutory holidays) – Holidays specifically listed in the Banking and Financial Dealings Act 1971.
 by royal proclamation – Under the Banking and Financial Dealings Act 1971, bank holidays are proclaimed each year by the legal device of a royal proclamation.
 by convention (common law holidays) - Holidays established in common law (not applicable in Scotland)

Royal proclamation is also used to move bank holidays that would otherwise fall on a weekend and to create extra one-off bank holidays for special occasions. The Act does not provide for a bank holiday to be suppressed by royal proclamation without appointing another day in its place. In this way, public holidays are not "lost" in years when they coincide with weekends. These deferred bank holiday days are termed a "bank holiday in lieu" of the typical anniversary date. In the legislation they are known as "substitute days". The movement of the St Andrew's Day Scottish holiday to the nearest Monday when 30 November is a weekend day is statutory and does not require a proclamation. Bank holidays falling on a weekend are always moved to a later date, not an earlier one.

Workers' rights 

Although there is no statutory right for workers to take paid leave on bank holidays, where paid leave is given (either because the business is closed or for other reasons), the bank holiday can count towards the minimum statutory holiday entitlement. Likewise, if people are required to work on a bank holiday, there is no statutory right to an enhanced pay rate nor to a day off in lieu, although many employers do give either or both. Any rights in this respect depend on the person's contract of employment. The statutory minimum paid holidays is 28 days (or 5.6 weeks) a year under the Working Time Regulations 1998 (including any bank holidays or public holidays that are taken).

Dates in England, Northern Ireland, and Wales

Changes 

 In 1968 and 1969 the new "August" bank holiday fell in September. This was as a result of the decision to move the holiday to the end of the month, and the nearest Monday being taken. The current definition was introduced in 1971.
 In 1995 the early May bank holiday was moved to Monday 8 May to commemorate the 50th anniversary of VE Day.
 In 2002, there was a special holiday on Monday 3 June to celebrate the Golden Jubilee of Elizabeth II. The Spring Bank Holiday was moved from 27 May to 4 June to create a four-day weekend.
 In 2012, there was a special holiday on Tuesday 5 June to celebrate the Diamond Jubilee of Elizabeth II. The Spring Bank Holiday moved to Monday 4 June to create a four-day weekend.
 In 2020, the early May bank holiday originally set for Monday 4 May was moved to Friday 8 May to commemorate the 75th anniversary of VE Day.
 In 2022, there was a special holiday on Friday 3 June to celebrate the Platinum Jubilee of Elizabeth II. The Spring Bank Holiday was moved to Thursday 2 June to create a four-day weekend.

Dates in Scotland

National bank holidays

Local holidays 
Local holidays are determined by local authorities across Scotland. Some of these may be taken in lieu of statutory holidays while others may be additional holidays, although many companies, including Royal Mail, do not follow all the holidays listed below, and many swap between English and local holidays.

Since Easter 1996 the Scottish clearing banks have harmonised the days on which they are closed with those in England and Wales and are therefore closed on Easter Monday and the last Monday in August (rather than the first). This has resulted in a number of local authorities creating a public holiday on Easter Monday. Previously Easter Monday had not been a public holiday in Scotland.

There have been protests about banks opening on 2 January since this decision was taken. This has resulted in many banks now providing only a limited service on 2 January, with most members of staff still entitled to the holiday.

Special holidays
 During the sterling crisis of 1968, Prime Minister Harold Wilson convened a meeting of the privy council in the early hours of 14 March to declare 15 March a bank holiday. This allowed the UK government to close the London gold market to stem the losses being suffered by the British pound. It was this meeting that triggered the resignation of Foreign Secretary George Brown.
 14 November 1973 was made a special bank holiday to celebrate the wedding of Princess Anne and Mark Phillips.
 7 June 1977 was made a special bank holiday as part of the Silver Jubilee of Elizabeth II.
 The wedding of Charles, Prince of Wales, and Lady Diana Spencer on 29 July 1981 resulted in an extra bank holiday.
 31 December 1999 was a one-off bank holiday as part of the Millennium celebrations.
 In 2002, there was a special holiday on Monday, 3 June, to celebrate the Golden Jubilee of Elizabeth II. The Spring Bank Holiday was moved from 27 May to 4 June to make it a four-day weekend.
 Friday 29 April 2011 was a special bank holiday to celebrate the wedding of Prince William and Catherine Middleton.
 In 2012, there was a special holiday on Tuesday 5 June to celebrate the Diamond Jubilee of Elizabeth II. Therefore, to create a four-day weekend, the Spring Bank Holiday that would usually have occurred at the end of May was moved to Monday 4 June.
In 2022, there was a special holiday on Friday 3 June to celebrate the Platinum Jubilee of Elizabeth II. Therefore, to create a four-day weekend, the Spring Bank Holiday that would usually occur at the end of May was moved to Thursday 2 June. An additional public holiday was declared for Monday 19 September, the day of the State Funeral of Queen Elizabeth II.
 In 2023, an additional public holiday will occur on Monday 8 May to commemorate the Coronation of King Charles III and Queen Camilla.

See also

 List of holidays by country
 Public and bank holidays in Scotland
 Public holidays in the Isle of Man
 Public holidays in Gibraltar
 Public holidays in Montserrat
 Public holidays in the Pitcairn Islands
 Public holidays in Saint Helena, Ascension and Tristan da Cunha
 UK labour law

References

External links
 Bank Holidays and British Summer Time
 Scotland Bank Holidays - Scottish Government

 
United Kingdom
Holidays